Maurizio Claudio Bravi (born 20 July 1962) is an Italian priest of the Catholic Church who has worked in the diplomatic service of the Holy See since 1995 and has served as the Permanent Observer of the Holy See to the World Tourism Organization (UNWTO) since 2016.

Biography
Maurizio Claudio Bravi was born on 20 July 1962 in Capriate San Gervasio, Bergamo, Italy. He studied at the local seminary and earned his bachelor's degree at the Theological Faculty of Northern Italy. He was ordained a priest of the Diocese of Bergamo on 21 June 1986, and spent the next five years at the parish of San Michele in Leffe.

In 1991 he began his preparation for a diplomatic service of the Pontifical Ecclesiastical Academy. He also studied at the Pontifical Gregorian University, earning his licenciate in 1993 and his doctorate in 1995 with a dissertation on the Synod of Bishops. In 1995, he entered the service of diplomacy of the Holy See on 1 July 1995 and fulfilled assignments in the Dominican Republic (1995-1998) and Argentina (1998-2000); then in the offices of the Secretariat of State; and in France (2006-2011) and Canada (2011-2016).

On 27 February 2016, Pope Francis appointed him Permanent Observer of the Holy See to the World Tourism Organization in Madrid.

Notes

See also
 List of heads of the diplomatic missions of the Holy See

References

Diplomats of the Holy See
Clergy from the Province of Bergamo
Pontifical Gregorian University alumni
Pontifical Ecclesiastical Academy alumni
Living people
1962 births